Aguapeí River or Aguapey River may refer to:

 Aguapeí River (Mato Grosso), Brazil
 Aguapeí River (São Paulo), Brazil
 Aguapey River, Argentina